The Last Wave (also released in the United States as Black Rain) is a 1977 Australian mystery drama film directed by Peter Weir. It is about a white solicitor in Sydney whose seemingly normal life is disrupted after he takes on a murder case and discovers that he shares a strange, mystical connection with the small group of local Aboriginal people accused of the crime.

Plot
The film opens with a montage of scenes of daily life in Australia in the 1970s: A rural school in the desert with children playing, the main street of an outback town, a traffic jam in the city, all being affected by unusually adverse weather conditions that suddenly appear. Heavy rainfall followed by unusually large chunks of hail breaking through the windows of the school injuring students, a frog infestation and other anomalies. Only the local Aboriginal people seem to recognize the cosmological significance of these weather phenomena.

During one of these freak rainstorms in Sydney, an altercation occurs among a group of Aboriginal people in a pub which results in a mysterious drowning death. At the coroner's inquest, the death is ruled a homicide and four of the Aboriginal men are accused of murder. Through the Australian Legal Aid system, a lawyer named David Burton (Richard Chamberlain) is procured for their defence. Due to internal politics and the eschatological divide between the European settlers and Indigenous people, the circumstances by which he was contacted and retained are unusual in that his law practice is corporate taxation and not criminal defence. He is reluctant at first but is intrigued by the challenge and takes on the case which shortly leads to his professional and personal life beginning to unravel.

Burton starts having bizarre dreams involving running water, drowned corpses, and one of being visited in his home by one of the incarcerated Aboriginals named Chris Lee (David Gulpilil), whom he had never met. When later introduced to the four accused men, he recognizes Lee and begins to sense an otherworldly connection to him and to the increasingly strange weather phenomena besetting the city. His dreams intensify along with his obsession with the murder case and he comes to suspect that the murder was an Aboriginal tribal execution in which a curse is put on the victim simply by pointing a bone at him. Lee refuses to admit that he is tribal or reveals anything about the murder but tells Burton that his dreams have meaning because he is "Mulkurul"; descended from a race of spirits who came from the rising sun bringing sacred objects with them. After meeting with the shaman of Lee's tribe and learning more about Aboriginal practices and the concept of Dreamtime as a parallel world of existence, Burton comes to believe that his dreams and the strange heavy rain bodes as signs of a coming apocalypse. After another intense dream, Burton senses danger and persuades his wife to leave the city with their children right before a torrential storm causes a flooding disaster.

In the chaos of the flood, Lee manages to escape from prison to find Burton and take him down through subterranean tunnels under the city which lead to a sacred Aboriginal ritual site. Lee shows him the entrance to another ancient chamber nearby that is strangely familiar to him and sends him off to find the answers that he seeks. In the chamber, Burton sees a painting on the ceiling depicting the arrival of European explorers from South America and a calendrical prophecy of a cataclysmic oceanic disaster. He finds a collection of ancient relics, a decayed corpse of a man wearing middle-age Western garments and a stone mask which after close inspection, bears a face identical to his own. He collects as many relics as he can carry but is suddenly confronted by the tribe's shaman shouting and lunging at him. They struggle and Burton kills the shaman with one of the stone relics. He tries to find his way back to the surface through the sewer tunnels, but he loses the relics along the way. He finally emerges through a drain pipe exhausted, then collapses on the beach and stares entranced at the horizon. He realizes that he can never go back to his old life after what had just happened. Then we see the look of both shock and acceptance on his face as the screen is filled by footage of a surreal towering ocean wave, though it remains unclear whether we are witnessing reality or sharing in Burton's final apocalyptic premonition.

Cast
Richard Chamberlain as David Burton
Olivia Hamnett as Annie Burton
David Gulpilil as Chris Lee
Fred Parslow as Reverend Burton
Vivean Gray as Dr Whitburn
Nandjiwarra Amagula as Charlie
Walter Amagula as Gerry Lee
Roy Bara as Larry
Cedrick Lalara as Lindsey
Morris Lalara as Jacko
Peter Carroll as Michael Zeadler
Athol Compton as Billy Corman
Hedley Cullen as Judge
Michael Duffield as Andrew Potter
Wallas Eaton as Morgue Doctor

Production
In an interview on the Criterion Collection DVD release, director Peter Weir explains that the film explores the question, "What if someone with a very pragmatic approach to life experienced a premonition?" Entered in the 6th Tehran International Film Festival in November 1977, the film won the Golden Ibex prize.

Finance was provided by the Australian Film Commission ($120,000), the South Australian Film Corporation ($120,000), Janus Films (US$50,000) and United Artists ($350,000). US based writer Petru Popescu worked on the script. Weir considered two Australian actors to play the lead but eventually decided to go with Richard Chamberlain. Filming started 24 February 1977 and took place in Adelaide and Sydney.

Reception and accolades
The Last Wave was met with positive reviews from critics and audiences, earning an 87% approval rating on Rotten Tomatoes. The film also holds an 85/100 on Metacritic.

The Last Wave was released on DVD by the Criterion Collection as spine #142.

Box office
The Last Wave was not as popular as Weir's 1975 film Picnic at Hanging Rock but still grossed $1,258,000 at the box office in Australia,.

United Artists decided not to release the film in the US but it was picked up by World Northal and distributed in the US as Black Rain.

See also
Cinema of Australia
Dreamtime
List of Australian films
South Australian Film Corporation
Kurdaitcha, a mystical executioner in Aboriginal culture.

References

External links
 
 
 
The Last Wave at Oz Movies
The Last Wave an essay by Diane Jacobs at the Criterion Collection
The Last Wave, National Film and Sound Archive, Australia

1977 films
1970s mystery thriller films
1970s thriller drama films
Apocalyptic films
Australian thriller drama films
Films about reincarnation
Films directed by Peter Weir
Films set in Sydney
Films shot in Adelaide
Films shot in Flinders Ranges
Films shot in Sydney
Films about race and ethnicity
Australian mystery thriller films
Films about Aboriginal Australians
Films set on boats
Films about dreams
1977 drama films
1970s English-language films